Dirt dog is an athletic nickname given to certain baseball players who are considered "scrappy" or blue-collar, hard working and tenacious and generally rough around the edges.

This term's origin is unknown, but it may have originated in the Boston Red Sox organization, as it was widely popularized there. In Boston, it was used to describe former Right Fielder Trot Nixon. Nixon gained great popularity with Red Sox fans for this particular style of play. He is considered by Red Sox fans as emblematic of the term for his gritty play, as well as his often dirty uniform, ballcap, and pine tar caked helmet. The term's usage is not limited to the Red Sox organization and is used broadly throughout the sport.

The first written documentation of the term has been cited with former Sox pitcher Paul Quantrill. Quantrill was quoted as saying, "...if they can keep it close, this pack of 'dirt dogs' will find a way to win."

In popular media
The BostonDirtDogs.com blog, which is owned by the New York Times Company (and affiliated with The Boston Globe), started out as a Boston Red Sox fan website.

External links
BostonDirtDogs.com

Baseball terminology
Nicknames in baseball